Kean Lewis (born 19 September 1992) is an Indian professional footballer who plays as a who plays as a midfielder for I-League club Mohammedan.

Club career

Early career
Born in Thane, Lewis began his career with PIFA. At the age of 14 he was invited to Leicester City for a trial with their academy. before joining the youth side of Mahindra United and then Tata Football Academy in 2008. In 2010, Lewis moved to the United States where he played for the Fairleigh Dickinson Knights while completing his education.

After graduating, Lewis moved to Houston, Texas, where he joined the under-23 side of Houston Dynamo. In 2015, he joined Mexican club Inter Acapulco and spent a month. After moving back to the US, he signed a spell with the Laredo Heat of Premier Development League.

Mohun Bagan
In July 2015, Lewis trialled with Mohun Bagan, the reigning I-League champions. before signing with Bagan. Initially appearing in the Calcutta Football League, the state league, Lewis made his professional debut for Bagan on 9 January 2016 against Aizawl, starting the match and playing 90 minutes as his team won 3–1. He was awarded Man of the Match in his second game against Bengaluru FC, who then go on to become champions during the season.

Delhi Dynamos
Kean went on to play for Delhi Dynamos on Loan. He flourished under the guidance of Head Coach Gianlucca Zambrotta, scoring 4 goals and 2 assist. He was the 2nd highest Indian goal scorer and played all the games in the ISL 3 season, helping the team to reach the semis where they bowed out to Kerala Blasters in Penalty shootout.

FC Pune City
Post his stunning season in the previous ISL and AFC, Kean was picked by FC Pune City from the draft in the 4th edition of the ISL. His stint at the club wasn't great due to his injury in pre season. Although recovered and fit for the season, he played only 7 games even though the team reached the semis.

Bengaluru
Post his unsuccessful season at Pune City, Bengaluru FC picked him up on a 1 year deal. He was part of the ISL winning squad that season in 2018–19, recording appearances in 17 games. The Blue went on to extend his contract for another season where he played all the AFC games and a few ISL games as well, taking the blues to the semis once again.

Sudeva Delhi
On 9 October 2020, Kean Lewis joined  I-League side Sudeva Delhi FC for the 2020–21 I-League season. He   made his debut for Sudeva Delhi  against Mohammedan SC on 9 January 2021. Kean Lewis scored his first goal for the club in the match against Indian Arrows and the club registered their first I-league victory.

Career statistics

Club

Honours 
Bengaluru
Indian Super League: 2018–19

Mohammedan Sporting
CFL Premier Division A: 2022

See also 
 List of Indian football players in foreign leagues

References

External links 
 FDU Knights Profile

1992 births
Living people
People from Thane
Indian footballers
Mohun Bagan AC players
Association football midfielders
Footballers from Maharashtra
I-League players
Indian expatriate footballers
Bengaluru FC players
Odisha FC players
Tata Football Academy players
Laredo Heat players
Indian Super League players
FC Pune City players
Sudeva Delhi FC players
Mohammedan SC (Kolkata) players